Glyptotendipes barbipes is a species of midge in the family Chironomidae. It is found in Europe.

Subspecies
These two subspecies belong to the species Glyptotendipes barbipes:
 Glyptotendipes barbipes barbipes
 Glyptotendipes barbipes staegeri Kruseman, 1933

References

Further reading

External links

 

Chironomidae
Articles created by Qbugbot
Insects described in 1839